Benjamin Edwards Grey (1809–1875) was a 19th-century U.S. Representative from Kentucky, grandson of Benjamin Edwards.

Born in 1809 at "Shiloh," near Bardstown, Kentucky, Grey pursued an academic course.  He studied law, was admitted to the bar and began practice in Hopkinsville, Kentucky.  He was a member of the Kentucky House of Representatives from 1838 to 1839, and a member of the Kentucky Senate from 1847 to 1851.  He was presiding officer of the senate and Acting Lieutenant Governor in 1850.

Grey was elected as a Whig to the Thirty-second and Thirty-third Congresses (March 4, 1851 – March 3, 1855).  He was an unsuccessful candidate for reelection to the Thirty-fourth Congress in 1854.  He died in Selma, Alabama in 1875.

References

1809 births
1875 deaths
People from Nelson County, Kentucky
Kentucky lawyers
Members of the Kentucky House of Representatives
Kentucky state senators
Whig Party members of the United States House of Representatives from Kentucky
19th-century American politicians
19th-century American lawyers